Attack Attack! is an American metalcore band from Westerville, Ohio, originally formed in 2007 as Ambiance, later changing their name. Attack Attack!'s first release, an independent EP titled If Guns Are Outlawed, Can We Use Swords?, was released in 2007, which led to the signing of the band to Rise Records the same year. They released three full-length albums, Someday Came Suddenly, a self-titled album, and This Means War all through Rise Records. The band left Rise Records in 2012 and disbanded the following year after a farewell tour. On October 19, 2020, the band announced a re-formation, with a mix of returning and new members.

History

Formation and Someday Came Suddenly (2007–2008) 

Attack Attack! was formed around 2006 when Johnny Franck, Andrew Whiting, Nick White and Andrew Wetzel met Austin Carlile while playing in local high school bands. Caleb Shomo joined the band as the keyboardist, and they changed the name to Attack Attack! In 2007 the band entered a local studio where they recorded material that was put up on Myspace to promote their music. As the oldest member of the band, Wetzel also acted as their manager for most of the year. The band was taken on by manager Eric Rushing of The Artery Foundation who signed them to Rise Records in May 2008. As members of the band were still underage at this point, contractual discussions required parental consent. The material recorded in 2007 was put together on the EP If Guns Are Outlawed, Can We Use Swords? (2008). All 8 musicians involved in recording the demos are shown on the cover which include Ricky Lortz and John Holgado (who would replace original bassist Nick White). The band was also signed by booking agent David Shapiro of the Agency Group that resulted in nationwide tours. In November 2008 they released their debut full-length album, Someday Came Suddenly, on Rise. Many songs on the album were re-recorded tracks originally released on the If Guns Are Outlawed EP. Upon the release the album peaked on the Billboard Independent Albums chart and reached number 193 on the Billboard 200, with sales of more than 3,600 in its first week despite its mediocre reviews.

Lineup change (2009) 

Later, halfway through a tour supporting Maylene and the Sons of Disaster, vocalist Austin Carlile was ejected from the band and replaced with Nick Barham, brother of former Sleeping With Sirens drummer Gabe Barham Attack Attack! then toured with Escape the Fate, William Control, Black Tide and Burn Halo early in 2009. The band was part of the Warped Tour 2009 where they appeared on one of the smaller stages.

Attack Attack! released a music video for their song "Stick Stickly". The "Stick Stickly" video has led to a number of criticisms, including lengthy pieces by Buddyhead and the British newspaper The Guardian. It also lead to the creation of the internet meme "crabcore" mocking the "crab-like" stance of Attack Attack!'s guitarist featured in the music video. The band also has a "live" video for the song "Dr. Shavargo Pt. 3".

On October 19, 2009, lead vocalist Nick Barham announced his departure from Attack Attack! just two days short of their headliner tour, he stated in his blog on MySpace that "It was just time for change," and that there was no conflict between him and the other band members. The band then made the decision of Caleb Shomo to be moved as the band's primary vocalist but still remaining at his place as the keyboardist as well.

Self-titled album and Franck's departure (2010–2011) 

The band's self-titled album was released on June 8, 2010. They headlined the This Is a Family Tour in November 2010.

On November 10, 2010, Johnny Franck announced he had departed from the band to focus on his relationship with God. He has started a new project called The March Ahead. With this news also came a clip of a new song featuring Caleb Shomo on lead vocals. The music video for "Smokahontas" was released on January 21, 2011, and was directed by Thunder Down Country films. The music video featured Johnny Franck on guitar and singing, and Caleb Shomo on unclean vocals.

This Means War and second lineup change (2011–2012) 

On November 14, 2011, it was announced that the band's third full-length, This Means War would be released on January 17, 2012. The entire album was produced by Caleb Shomo at his home studio. Along with this news, they also posted dates for the "This Means War Tour" with supporting acts from The Ghost Inside, Sleeping with Sirens, Chunk! No, Captain Chunk!, and Dream On, Dreamer.  More news and the album artwork was released in the Hot Topic website "News." On December 13, 2011, they premiered a song from the album titled "The Motivation". 30 seconds of the whole track list were released on Amazon.com and pre-orders were also opened in many stores. On January 12, 2012. the band debuted the music video for the first single off the album, "The Wretched".

The band announced in 2012 their departure from Rise Records, simultaneous with an announcement that they have completed ten songs, produced by John Feldmann, for another album, although Wetzel said on his formspring "they're somewhere in Feldmann's hard drive" for they "would be too much work legally to get them released" The band stated that they "don't have another record label or anything lined up and [are] probably not planning on going to another one.", also that Wetzel "has [his] own label now [Oxide Entertainment] and will probably just use that" The band headlined the This World Is Ours Tour with Escape The Fate and the Word Alive.

On December 18, 2012, Caleb Shomo officially announced his departure from Attack Attack!, along with confirming the new vocalist of the band to be Phil Druyor of I Am Abomination.

On December 19, 2012, the band released a new song titled "No Defeat" through Alternative Press which song features the brand new line-up and was the first song to feature Phil Druyor on vocals and Tyler Sapp on bass. Jason Pettigrew of Alternative Press describes the song as "an intriguing mix of '80s FM-rock swagger and the electronic flourishes they built their career on". Andrew Wetzel also stated that the band will record more songs after "No Defeat". Attack Attack! released two video updates about their 4th studio album, which was never released.

Departure from label, final tours and the rise & fall of Nativ (2013) 

In early 2013, Attack Attack! started touring in Europe again with the new members. On April 22, 2013, Attack Attack! said that the Back in Action tour was going to be their last tour and the band would be "laid to rest" . 

Drummer Andrew Wetzel confirmed on his Formspring that In Fear and Faith guitarist Sean Bell left In Fear and Faith to become an official final member of Attack Attack! as well as a member of the new band that the former members made.

The final lineup of Attack Attack! had formed a new band, Nativ.  Andrew Wetzel confirmed that the last lineup of Attack Attack! will stay together and stated, "the album that was going to be Attack Attack!'s final untitled album will be released through his and Whitings' new band." Nativ's band-members consisted of Phil Druyor, Andrew Wetzel, Andrew Whiting, Tyler Sapp, and William Honto. On November 13, 2013, Nativ was delayed due to a physical altercation between Andrew Wetzel and Andrew Whiting leading to a legal battle.

Return (2020–present) 
In October 2020, the band had returned and were in the studio with producer Joey Sturgis writing new material, with a new single titled "All My Life" that was released on December 7, 2020. The new lineup was later confirmed to consist of original members Andrew Wetzel and Andrew Whiting, as well as new members, bassist Jay Miller and vocalist Chris Parketny.

On April 20, 2021, Attack Attack! released a short new song titled, "Kawaii Cowboys". It features a blend of style described as country, J-pop, and metalcore. On April 30, 2021, the band released a new song titled "Brachyura Bombshell".

Musical style
Attack Attack! have been described as "screamo/metalcore Christian rockers", electronicore, and post-hardcore combined with electronica influences.

Band members 

Current members
 Andrew Whiting – lead guitar (2007–2013; 2020–present), keyboards (2012–2013; 2020–present); rhythm guitar (2012–2013; 2020–2022)
 Andrew Wetzel – drums (2007–2013; 2020–present), keyboards (2012–2013; 2020–present)
 Chris Parketny – lead vocals (2020–present)
 Cameron Perry – bass, backing vocals (2021–present)
 Ryland Raus – clean vocals, rhythm guitar (2022–present; touring 2021)

Touring musicians
 Sean Mackowski – clean vocals, rhythm guitar (2010–2012)
 Jeremy Gilmore – lead vocals (2013)
 Sean Bell – rhythm guitar, backing vocals (2013)

Former members
 Ricky Lortz – clean vocals, rhythm guitar (2007)
 Nick White – bass (2007–2008)
 Austin Carlile – lead vocals (2007–2008)
 Nick Barham – lead vocals (2008–2009) 
 Johnny Franck – clean vocals, rhythm guitar (2007–2010) 
 John Holgado – bass (2008–2012), backing vocals (2010-2012)
 Caleb Shomo – keyboards (2008–2012), unclean vocals (2009–2012), clean vocals, rhythm guitar (2010–2012), backing vocals (2008–2009) 
 Phil Druyor – clean vocals (2012–2013)
 Tyler Sapp – bass (2012–2013)
 Jay Miller – bass, backing vocals (2020–2021); unclean vocals (2013; touring)

Timeline

Discography

Studio albums
 Someday Came Suddenly (2008)
 Attack Attack! (2010)
 This Means War (2012)

References

Metalcore musical groups from Ohio
Musical groups from Columbus, Ohio
Musical groups from Ohio
Musical groups established in 2007
Musical groups disestablished in 2013
Musical groups reestablished in 2020
Articles which contain graphical timelines
Rise Records artists